KTXV (890 kHz) is a commercial AM radio station licensed to Mabank, Texas, and serving the Dallas/Fort Worth Metroplex. It is owned by Sukhdev Dhillon, through licensee Radio Punjab Dallas LLC.  KTXV airs a full service radio format of popular music, news and talk, in Punjabi and other languages of South Asia as well as English.

By day, KTXV broadcasts at 20,000 watts.  But during the nighttime hours, KTXV drastically reduces its power to 250 watts to protect Class A clear channel station WLS in Chicago.  KTXV uses a directional antenna at all times.  The transmitter is off U.S. Route 175 in Eustace, Texas.

History
  Signal testing for this station began in November 2007 in English and Asian languages. Once testing was complete, the station began broadcasting a Vietnamese format known as "Radio Saigon."

Radio Saigon later moved to KRVA 1600 AM to make way for a Mandarin and English format supplied by Radio China International.

References

External links
China Radio International (Official Website in English)

 DFW Radio/TV History

Country radio stations in the United States
Radio stations established in 1980
TXV